Millward is a surname meaning someone in charge of a mill.

 Alun Millward Davies, the full name of Alun Davies (biologist) (born 1955), a Welsh biologist
 F. Millward Grey (1899–1957), English painter, etcher and art teacher
 George Millward McDougall, the full name of George McDougall (1821–1876), a Methodist missionary in Canada
 Andrew Millward (born 1972), Welsh rugby union player
 Anna Millward (born 1971), Australian cycle racer
 Arthur Millward (1858–1933), English first class cricketer and Test match umpire
 Carl King-Millward (1935–2000), British mathematician
 Charles Millward (1830–1892), English musician, composer, actor, and journal proprietor
 Dawson Millward (1870–1926), British stage and film actor
 Doug Millward (1931–2000), English Association football (soccer) player
 Doug Millward (footballer, born 1862), English Association football (soccer) player
 Edward Millward (born 1930), Welsh nationalist politician
 Ernie Millward (1887–1962), English footballer
 Ian Millward (born 1960), Australian rugby league footballer, coach and commentator
 Jessie Millward (1861–1932, English stage actress
 Perry Millward (born 1992), English stage actor
 Roger Millward (1947–2016), English rugby league footballer and coach
 Sid Millward (1909–1972), English comedy bandleader
 Stephanie Millward (born 1981), British Paralympic swimmer
 William Millward (1822–1871), American politician

See also

 Milward, a surname
 Millard (disambiguation)

References

Occupational surnames